Zographus niveisparsus is a species of beetle in the family Cerambycidae. It was described by Louis Alexandre Auguste Chevrolat in 1844, originally under the genus Sternotomis. It is known from South Africa, Mozambique, and Zimbabwe.

References

Sternotomini
Beetles described in 1844